David Timon Bowden  (1891–1949) was an outfielder in Major League Baseball for the St. Louis Browns of the American League. He played in 7 games during the 1914 season. He attended the University of Georgia prior to his professional debut.

In 1916 he managed the Montgomery Rebels in the South Atlantic League and in 1920 the Rome team in the Georgia State League. On October 25, 1949, Bowden committed suicide by shooting himself with a pistol in his home in Decatur, Georgia.

References

External links

1891 births
1949 suicides
Major League Baseball outfielders
St. Louis Browns players
Baseball players from Georgia (U.S. state)
Portland Duffs players
San Antonio Bronchos players
Mobile Sea Gulls players
Minor league baseball managers
People from McDonough, Georgia
Suicides by firearm in Georgia (U.S. state)